Deulin is a surname. Notable people with the surname include:

Charles Deulin (1827–1877), French writer, theatre critic, and folklorist
Charles-Joseph de Harlez de Deulin (1832–1899), Belgian Orientalist, domestic prelate,  canon of the cathedral of Liège
Vladislav Deulin (* 1994), Russian sport climber

See also 
Deulin Castle, a château in the village of Deulin in the province of Luxembourg, Wallonia, Belgium